Fortunestown is a stop on the Luas light-rail tram system in Dublin, Ireland.  It opened in 2011 as a stop on the extension of the Red Line to Saggart.  The stop is located on a section of reserved track next to Citywest Drive in the Citywest development in south-west Dublin which includes a hotel, golf course, shopping centre, and housing.  Fortunestown stop provides access to Citywest Shopping Centre.

The stop is served by Dublin Bus routes 65B and 77A.

References

Luas Red Line stops in South Dublin (county)